Juan Rafael Fuentes Hernández (born 5 January 1990) is a Spanish professional footballer who plays as a left back.

Club career

Córdoba
Born in Córdoba, Andalusia, Fuentes made his professional debut with hometown club Córdoba CF on 10 October 2009, appearing in a 1–1 away draw against Real Murcia in the Segunda División. He was a first-team regular over the course of four seasons at that level, featuring in 30 games in 2011–12 (all starts) and 35 the following campaign.

Fuentes scored his first goal as a senior on 30 March 2013, helping the hosts defeat CE Sabadell FC 3–0.

Espanyol
Fuentes joined La Liga side RCD Espanyol on 19 June 2013, on a four-year deal. He played his first match in the top flight on 19 August, starting in a 2–2 draw at RC Celta de Vigo.

Osasuna
On 11 August 2016, Fuentes signed for CA Osasuna also in the top tier. The following 27 July, after suffering relegation, he terminated his contract.

Nottingham Forest
On 8 February 2018, after six months without a club, Fuentes signed with Nottingham Forest which was managed by countryman Aitor Karanka. His only Championship appearance of the season took place on 24 April, when he played the first half of the 3–0 home win over Barnsley.

References

External links

1990 births
Living people
Footballers from Córdoba, Spain
Spanish footballers
Association football defenders
La Liga players
Segunda División players
Tercera División players
Córdoba CF B players
Córdoba CF players
RCD Espanyol footballers
CA Osasuna players
English Football League players
Nottingham Forest F.C. players
Spanish expatriate footballers
Expatriate footballers in England
Spanish expatriate sportspeople in England